Gilles Pudlowski (born 15 November 1950 in Metz, Moselle) is a French journalist, writer, literary and gastronomic critic of Polish descent. He writes the blog les Pieds dans le Plat, writes for Saveurs, Cuisine et Vins de France and Les Dernières Nouvelles d'Alsace. He is also the author of the Pudlo guides.

Biography 
Gilles Pudlowski was born in Metz, Moselle to a family of Polish immigrants. His grandfather, Józef Pudłowski, was a laborer at Solvay and voted for Polish United Workers' Party. His parents were both born in Poland, his father in Łódź and his mother in Zamość. At the age of nine, in 1959, Gilles began to actively practice Judaism. The day after May 68 Gilles joined New Socialist Party.

After graduating from the Institut d'études politiques de Paris and a history degree, he made his debut at Le Quotidien de Paris founded by Philippe Tesson before joining Les Nouvelles littéraires. Jean-François Kahn, who took up the latter magazine, entrusted him with responsibility for the literary pages and asked him to take charge also of the gastronomic chronicle.

Christian Millau, who spotted him in 1979, offered him to collaborate with the Gault Millau, promising him a career of rigorous criticism in these terms: "In this job, people know how to eat or write, rarely both, sometimes none of the two. If you can do both, you're sure to succeed".

He latter wrote for Paris Match, Cuisine et Vins de France, (where he created the category of "plates", awarding one to three plates to good restaurants, the pot with good quality / price ratio and the broken plate, which will make much of his reputation as "the Zorro of the critique" at the disappointing tables). He has worked with Panorama du Médecin, Parcours, Le Figaro, Cuisine TV, France Inter, Bon Voyage, Air France Madame.

His reputation is notably linked to the weekly Le Point, of which he was the official columnist from 1986 to 2014. He was a senior reporter and was responsible for the pages of tourism and gastronomy, while actively collaborating on the literary section.

From 1990 to 2016, Gilles Pudlowski gave a weekly column to Les Dernières Nouvelles d'Alsace and, from 1992 to 2015, to Le Républicain lorrain, for, if he is Lorrain by birth, he is an Alsatian at heart.

For the magazines Saveurs et Cuisine et Vins de France, he made major reports on the regions of France and portraits of the chefs in Europe and in the world. Since 2016, he has been a member of the j ury du prix du premier roman.

After a few piecemeal trials (including several editions of 52 week-ends autour de Paris or le Guide de l’Alsace heureuse, he created, in 1989, his own "global" guide. It is first of all the Pudlowski Guide of the Gourmet Cities (Albin Michel) which obtained the Gutenberg of the practical book in 1990. The Pudlo Paris is published every year from 1990, like the Pudlo France, since 2000, by Michel Lafon.

Gilles Pudlowski has also published "Pudlos" in pocket format devoted to Parisian bistros, Brittany, Alsace, Lorraine, Corsica and Luxembourg. Since 2007, the "Pudlo Paris" and the "Pudlo France" have been published in New York by the Little Book Room, editorial emanation of The New York Review of Books, which also published (in 2008) small Pudlos "Brittany-Normandy", "Alsace" and "Provence Côte d'Azur". The US press sees it as the "best kept secret of French gourmets" and in particular, like the New York Times, that "his plates are more reliable than Michelin stars".

As a confirmed writer, Gilles Pudlowski published autobiographical essays on the theme of attachment to France, such as Devoir de Français, L’Amour du pays (Flammarion), crowned by the Prix Jacques Chardonne and the Prix Maurice Genevoix, but also Les Chemins de la Douce France (Plon) as well as a novel, Le Voyage de Clémence (Flammarion, 1987) and Le Dictionnaire amoureux de l'Alsace (Plon).

He is also responsible for the preface of the Larousse gastronomique (2007), literary anthologies (L'Année Poétique, Le Goût de Strasbourg),art books (Les Grandes gueules, Elles sont chefs, Les Trésors gourmands de la France, France Bistrots, Les Plus belles tables de France), As well as a handbook of good manners: Comment être critique gastronomique et garder la ligne, which he will update a few years later with À quoi sert vraiment un critique gastronomique, which became the reference work on this domain.

His blog Les Pieds dans le plat, obtained La Gastronomie Numérique award at "Gastronomades 2015".

Distinctions 
1986: Chevalier des Arts et des Lettres
1996: Chevalier du Order of Agricultural Merit
2009: Chevalier of the National Order of Merit

Bibliography 
Éditions Michel Lafon
 Le Pudlo France, 2000, 2001, 2002, 2003, 2005, 2006, 2007, 2008, 2009
 Le Pudlo Paris, 1999, 2000, 2001, 2002, 2003, 2004, 2005, 2006, 2007, 2008, 2009, 2010, 2011, 2012, 2013, 2014, 2015
 Le Pudlo Paris des Bistrots et Brasseries, 2007, 2009, 2010
 Le Pudlo Week-Ends, 2000
 Le Pudlo Corse, 2004, 2005
 Le Pudlo Bretagne, 2005, 2008, 2009, 2010
 Le Pudlo Alsace, 2007, 2009, 2011, 2012, 2013, 2014, 2015
 Le Pudlo Lorraine, 2007, 2009
 Le Pudlo Luxembourg, 2007

Flammarion
 Le Devoir de Français, narrative, 1984.
 L'Amour du Pays, narrative, 1986 (prix Maurice Genevoix, prix Jacques Chardonne).
 Le Voyage de Clémence, novel, 1987.
 Elles sont chefs (photos by Maurice Rougemont), 2005.
 Les plus belles tables de France (photos by Maurice Rougemont), 2011.

 Le Devoir de Français (2012)

Armand Colin
 À quoi sert vraiment un critique gastronomique?, 2011

 France Bistrots (photos by Maurice Rougemont) 2012.
 Les Grandes Tables de Paris (photos by Maurice Rougemont) 2013

Éditions du Chêne
 Le Crocodile de Philippe Bohrer (photos by Maurice Rougemont) 2012.
 Le Tour de France Gourmand (photos by Maurice Rougemont) 2014, Prix des Ecrivains gastronomes 2015
 La Maison Kammerzell (photos by Maurice Rougemont) 2014

Glénat Editions
 Les Grandes Gueules et leurs recettes (photos de Maurice Rougemont) 2009.

Mercure de France
 Le Goût de Strasbourg, 2006

Éditions Athéo
 Le Pudlo Alsace-Lorraine, 2004

Mazarine/Fayard
 Le Pudlo de Paris Gourmand, 1998.

Ramsay/Michel Lafon
 Le Pudlo de Paris Gourmand, 1995, 1996, 1997.

Éditions Jean-Paul Schortgen
 Le Pudlo Luxembourg, 2002, 2005.

Éditions de la Renaissance du Livre
 Les Trésors Gourmands de la France (photos by Maurice Rougemont), 1997.

Éditions du Rocher
Comment être critique gastronomique et garder la ligne, 2004
 Le Devoir de Français, récit 2003

Robert Laffont
 Saveurs des Terroirs de France, avec les sœurs Scotto, 1991.

Plon
 Le Dictionnaire Amoureux de l'Alsace, 2010 
 Les Chemins de la Douce France,  récit, 1996.

Albin Michel
 52 week-ends autour de Paris, 1983, 1985, 1987, 1990, 1993.
 52 week-ends en France, en collaboration, 1986.
 La Jeune Cuisine d'Alsace, 1986.
 Le Guide Pudlowski de l'Alsace Gourmande, 1988, 1989, 1992, 1995.
 Le Guide Pudlowski des Villes Gourmandes, 1989 (Gutenberg du livre pratique 1990).
 Le Guide Pudlowski de Paris gourmand, 1990, 1991.
 52 week-ends dans les Relais et Châteaux, 1991, 1994.

Argentoratum
 Le Pudlo Alsace de l’an 2000, 1999

Bueb et Reumaux
 Le Guide de l'Alsace heureuse, 1985.

Éditions Saint-Germain-des-Prés
 Litanie du Blues, 1974
 Jean Poperen et l'UGCS, du PSU au Parti socialiste, itinéraire d'un courant politique, 1975

François Bourin
 Je vous écris de Strasbourg, 1988.

Poche-DNA/Éditions de la Nuée bleue
 Guide de Strasbourg gourmand, 1993
 Winstubs d'Alsace, 1994, 1996.
 Paris für Feinschmecker, 1994 (in German).
 Lorraine gourmande, 1996.

JC Lattès
 Le Guide Pudlowski de Paris Gourmand, 1992 (prix la Mazille), 1993, 1994.

 L'Année poétique 77, anthology, 1978.

Hologrammes
 Paris, fête gourmande, 1990

Éditions Ouest-France
Bretagne Nouvelle Vague (photos by Jean-Daniel Sudres), 2012
Alsace Nouvelle Vague (photos by Maurice Rougemont), 2013
Alsace Tradition (photos by Maurice Rougemont), 2013

A Little Book Room (New York)
 Pudlo Paris 2007-2008, 
 Pudlo France 2008-2009, 
 Pudlo Normandy & Brittany 2008-2009, 
 Pudlo Alsace 2008-2009, 
 Pudlo Provence, the Côte-d’Azur & Monaco 2008-2009, 

Éditions Alexandrines
  L’Alsace des écrivains, 2016. 

Éditions Gründ/Plon
Le Dictionnaire Amoureux illustré de l'Alsace, 2016

Éditions Steinkis/Incipit
Dans la tête de Pierre H, 2016

References

External links 
Les pieds dans le plat, blog de Gilles Pudlowski.
Gilles Pudlowski on the site of Michel Lafon.

20th-century French journalists
21st-century French journalists
20th-century French writers
21st-century French writers
French literary critics
Restaurant guides
French food writers
Sciences Po alumni
Chevaliers of the Ordre des Arts et des Lettres
Knights of the Order of Agricultural Merit
Knights of the Ordre national du Mérite
1950 births
Writers from Metz
Living people
French people of Polish-Jewish descent